The Hired Husband (Spanish: Un marido a precio fijo) is a 1942 Spanish comedy film directed by Gonzalo Delgrás and starring Rafael Durán and Lina Yegros. Its plot also has elements of melodrama.

Plot 
The protagonist, Estrella, is the goddaughter of the opulent king of synthetic shoe polish. In order to create marketing, Estrellita motivates the interest of the radio and newspapers. The millionaire leaves her boyfriend standing up in the middle of an argument, he is a bored-looking man in his forties, and she leaves him to travel to different countries in Europe. In a hotel she meets Eric whom she is to marry in twenty days. He leaves her and back home she proposes to a train robber to supplant her husband.

Cast
 Pepe Blanco 
 Ana María Campoy 
 Rafael Durán as Miguel  
 Juana Ferrer
 Leonor Fábregas 
 Jorge Greiner 
 Juana Mansó 
 Manuel de Melero
 Juan Muñiz 
 José Sanchíz 
 Cristina Santaolalla 
 Lily Vicenti 
 Luis Villasiul 
 Lina Yegros as Estrella

References

Bibliography 
 Labanyi, Jo & Pavlović, Tatjana. A Companion to Spanish Cinema. John Wiley & Sons, 2012.

External links 
 

1942 films
1942 comedy films
Spanish comedy films
1940s Spanish-language films
Films directed by Gonzalo Delgrás
Spanish black-and-white films
1940s Spanish films